= Kiriakos Evangelou =

Cypriot footballer (born 1972)

Koullis Evangelou (Greek: Κυριάκος Ευαγγελου) (born 28 October 1972) is a football player who played Center back in the Cypriot division 1. He played for Aris Limassol F.C. from 1983 to 1996, where he was the Captain. He then played for Omonoia Nicosia for two seasons, then played for Alki Larnaca F.C. After Alki, he continued to play for lower league teams. After that he retired and is now playing some matches with Omonoias Veterans and Aris Veterans.
